Idylle au Caire is a 1933 German French-language comedy film directed by Claude Heymann and Reinhold Schünzel and starring Renate Müller, George Rigaud and Henry Roussel. It was an alternate language version of the film Season in Cairo made by UFA.

The film's sets were designed by the art directors Robert Herlth and Walter Röhrig. It was shot at the Babelsberg Studios and on location in Egypt.

Cast

References

Bibliography

External links

1933 films
1933 musical comedy films
German musical comedy films
1930s French-language films
Films directed by Reinhold Schünzel
Films directed by Claude Heymann
Films set in Egypt
German multilingual films
UFA GmbH films
Films shot at Babelsberg Studios
German black-and-white films
1933 multilingual films
1930s German films